Times Square is a 1980 American drama film directed by Allan Moyle and starring Trini Alvarado and Robin Johnson as teenage runaways from opposite sides of the tracks and Tim Curry as a radio DJ. The film is set in New York City. The plot embodies a punk rock ethic of misunderstood youth articulating their frustrations toward adult authority through music.

Plot
Nicky Marotta and Pamela Pearl are two teenage girls who meet in the New York Neurological Hospital, where both are being examined for mental illness. Pamela is depressed and insecure, and neglected and exploited by her father, David Pearl, a prominent and wealthy commissioner running a campaign to "clean up" Times Square. Nicky is a tough-talking street kid with musical aspirations, sent to the hospital for an evaluation after an altercation with police. Sharing a room, the brash Nicky and shy Pamela become friends. Nicky admires Pamela's poetic spirit; Pamela admires Nicky's forthright attitude and resents the condescending way in which the doctors treat her. Nicky is released from the hospital and later returns, ostensibly for an appointment with her social worker Rosie Washington, but really to break Pamela out. Both girls escape the hospital, steal an ambulance, and hide out in abandoned warehouse on the Chelsea Piers, making a pact to scream out each other's names in times of trouble.

There is a citywide search for Pamela after David reports her missing and accuses Nicky of kidnapping her, claiming Pamela needs medical attention. Meanwhile, the girls try to eke out a living by engaging in card games, petty theft, odd jobs, and scavenging. Radio DJ Johnny LaGuardia, who broadcasts from a penthouse studio overlooking Times Square, realizes that David's missing daughter is the same "Zombie Girl" who sent him letters, telling him how sad and insecure she feels. LaGuardia, who resents David's "Reclaim Rebuild Restore" campaign to gentrify Times Square, uses his radio station, WJAD, to reach out to Nicky and Pamela. The girls start writing songs together and form an underground punk rock band, named The Sleez Sisters, with the help of LaGuardia, who sees them as an opportunity to undermine David. When an open letter to Pamela from Rosie is printed in the newspaper (with the help of David), calling Nicky troubled and dangerous, the girls perform a defiant Sleez Sisters song live on WJAD, making them even more famous. As an act of further rebellion, Nicky and Pamela throw TVs off a series of rooftops in the city.

Pamela and Nicky eventually have a falling out when they realize that their lives are on divergent paths. Pamela is content with her newfound sense of identity and wants to return home. Nicky wants to continue with The Sleez Sisters and becomes jealous of Pamela's relationship with LaGuardia. One night, she accuses LaGuardia of exploiting Pamela and herself, and throws LaGuardia and Pamela out of the warehouse hideout. Nicky then has a breakdown, wrecking her home and destroying the journal she shared with Pamela. After a failed attempt to drown herself, Nicky drunkenly breaks into WJAD and demands that LaGuardia put her on the air (but, unknown to Nicky, he never does). Midway through her song, Nicky breaks down and asks Pamela for help, shouting out her name. A sympathetic LaGuardia takes Pamela to Nicky. Pamela, breaking ties with LaGuardia, takes Nicky to David's office, located in the middle of Times Square. Pamela calls all the local radio stations, announcing an impromptu, and illegal, midnight show in Times Square on the rooftop of a grindhouse on 42nd Street. A message is sent to the fans of The Sleez Sisters, inviting them to attend the concert. Nicky says "If they treat you like garbage, put on a garbage bag. If they treat you like a bandit, black out your eyes!" Girls across the city heed Nicky's call and board buses and subways to converge in Times Square.

In a garbage-bag costume and bandit-mask-style makeup, Nicky sings on the marquee roof above a crowd of cheering fans, also in garbage bags with "bandit" makeup. With the police approaching from behind, Nicky jumps off the edge of the marquee and into a blanket held taut by a group of fans. Camouflaged in the crowd, Nicky manages to evade capture by the police. Pamela watches her friend vanish into the night.

Cast

Production

Development
Times Square was directed by Allan Moyle from a script written by Jacob Brackman, based on a story by Moyle and Leanne Ungar. The movie was inspired by a diary, found in a second-hand couch bought by Moyle, detailing the life on the streets of a young mentally disturbed woman.

"This girl was burning the candle at both ends," said Moyle. "She would go into bars - she was too young - but she would go in anyway and get arrested. She had no intention of reaching the age of 21."

According to the DVD commentary, the original title of the project was "She's Got the Shakes."

Moyle wrote a script that attracted the interest of Tim Curry. Moyle then arranged for Jacob Brackman to do a rewrite.

The script caught the attention of Robert Stigwood, the impresario behind the musical films Saturday Night Fever (1977), Grease (1978), and Sgt. Pepper's Lonely Hearts Club Band (1978). Moyle said, "I think they had been planning to shoot something this summer that fell through, and I was hysterical about wanting it to be shot, so we made a deal with them. They were very sensitive to the script."

Casting
Although Tim Curry has a supporting role in Times Square (and filmed all his scenes in two days), his familiarity with film audiences ensured that he received top-billing onscreen and in the film's advertising above the two unknown leads, 15-year-old Robin Johnson and 13-year-old Trini Alvarado. Robin Johnson's casting was a bit of a fluke. According to Johnson, she was cutting class – cutting up – and had been approached by a supposed talent scout, claiming she should audition for the film. She had never seen or heard from this man after the one meeting and no one from the film crew knew of him.

Filming
The film went into production with a $6 million budget. Filming started in New York in October 1979. It was meant to be the first of four Stigwood films shot in New York, the others being The Fan, Angel and Staying Alive.

Post-production
The original cut of Times Square contained lesbian content which was mostly deleted from the final print (which is still a lesbian love story). Moyle revealed in the DVD audio commentary that the film's integrity was compromised by the removal of the more overt lesbian content, and the addition of several "inappropriate" songs to the film's soundtrack at the insistence of producer Robert Stigwood, who wanted the film to be another Saturday Night Fever and insisted that the soundtrack be a double album to make the film more commercially viable.

Allan Moyle and Robin Johnson remarked on the audio commentary that the loss of key scenes made the narrative disjointed, and damaged the story's emotion and characterizations. They also note that the film's focus changes, jarringly, from Pamela to Nicky, and that the increasingly outlandish and unrealistic story undermines the movie's gritty, on-location documentary style.

Moyle left production before the film was completed, and other people supervised scenes to accompany the soundtrack additions (for example, the sequence featuring teens preparing to go to the Sleez Sisters' final concert was shot by the film's second unit).

The version of the film released to theatres was not Moyle's preferred cut; however, he still acknowledges the finished film's importance as it documents a Times Square that mostly no longer exists: the film was shot on location and captured Times Square's seedy, grindhouse atmosphere before it was cleaned up in the mid-1990s.

Release
The film was advertised with the taglines "In the heart of Times Square, a poor girl becomes famous, a rich girl becomes courageous, and both become friends" and "TIMES SQUARE is the music of the streets."

Reaction
Upon its original theatrical release, Times Square was not a commercial or critical success.

Roger Ebert wrote, "Times Square rarely comes together into anything more than a good idea that fails, but there are times when it seems on the brink of wonderful things. Of all the bad movies I've seen recently, this is the one that projects the real sense of a missed opportunity - of potential achievement gone wrong. The problem may be with the screenplay. This is a movie that knows who its characters are, but doesn't seem sure about what they're doing."

Other reviews of the film were generally negative, but Robin Johnson's performance was frequently singled out for praise. Johnson, in fact, signed an exclusive three-year contract with the Robert Stigwood Organization, with the understanding that RSO would develop film and music projects for her. RSO intended to market Johnson as "the female John Travolta," and her contract legally barred her from accepting offers or auditions from rival companies. Johnson therefore turned down calls from agents, producers and casting directors, but the projects RSO promised her never came to fruition. Johnson took a job as a bank teller whilst waiting for her RSO contract to expire, and by the time it did, there were no offers for work. Johnson did some minor film and TV roles, but by the late 1980s, she gave up on acting and got a job as a traffic reporter on a Los Angeles radio station.

Allan Moyle later said he "had a rotten time" on the film, adding "And I just figured I wasn't combative enough to be a director." Moyle did not direct again until Pump Up the Volume in 1990.

Cult reputation
Over the years since its original release, Times Square has been rediscovered and become a staple at gay and lesbian film festivals, because of the aforementioned, subtly-portrayed lesbian relationship between the film's two female leads. Kathleen Hanna of Bikini Kill and Le Tigre cites this as one of her favorite films.

Welsh rock group Manic Street Preachers covered the Times Square song "Damn Dog" on their debut album Generation Terrorists (1992) and quoted dialogue from the film in the album liner notes ("Damn Dog" was, however, excluded from the American release of the album). A live version of the Manics performing "Damn Dog" is included in Generation Terrorists: 20th Anniversary Edition (2012).

The Manics titled their song "Roses in the Hospital" (from their second album, 1993's Gold Against the Soul) after Pamela's line "What about the roses in the hospital?" (alluding to the scene in which Nicky eats roses to distract Pamela from the doctors and her father). In concerts and publicity shots in 1993, Manics bassist Nicky Wire often wore bankrobber-mask-style makeup as Nicky Marotta does in the film.

Home video
The movie was released on DVD by Anchor Bay Entertainment in 2000. Extra features on this DVD include audio commentary by director/co-writer Allan Moyle and star Robin Johnson, and the film's original theatrical trailer. Allan Moyle has stated that a director's cut of Times Square is unlikely to surface because the footage needed for its restoration is missing. Kino Lorber released the film on Blu-ray in May 2022 from a 4k remaster.

Soundtrack 

The film's release was accompanied by a double album soundtrack of punk rock and new wave music. The soundtrack comprises pre-existing songs as well as original songs commissioned for the film, and features a wide range of artists, including the Ramones, the Cure, XTC, Lou Reed, Gary Numan, Talking Heads, Garland Jeffreys, Joe Jackson, Suzi Quatro, Roxy Music, Patti Smith and the Pretenders.

The Suzi Quatro track "Rock Hard" is identified in the film as being Nicky and Pamela's favorite record. The song "Help Me!", which plays over the film's closing scene, is a duet between Robin Gibb (of the Bee Gees) and Marcy Levy. The song "Down in the Park" is credited as being performed by Gary Numan, but technically it was recorded when Numan was using the band name Tubeway Army. The version of "Down in the Park" included on the Times Square soundtrack is not the album/single version from Replicas (1979), but an earlier version of the song later released on Numan's Replicas Redux (2008).

The soundtrack features original songs sung by the film's actors: "Damn Dog" by Johnson, "Your Daughter Is One" by Johnson and Alvarado, and "Flowers of the City" by Johnson and David Johansen. The song "Dangerous Type" by the Cars features in the film, but was not included on the soundtrack.

As a compilation of some of the more important new wave and punk music from the era, the soundtrack achieved far more notoriety than the film did on its release. It became a collectors' item among fans of XTC because it included the specially written XTC track "Take This Town", which was released as a single with its B-side track "Babylon's Burning" by the Ruts and for many years was only available on this soundtrack.

In his audio commentary for the DVD, Allan Moyle mentions that David Bowie was commissioned to provide a song for the movie's soundtrack, but Bowie's label at that time wouldn't let the filmmakers use it. (At the time, Bowie was still under contract with RCA Victor Records, and the Times Square album was issued by RSO Records, at the time distributed by RCA Victor competitor PolyGram; however, it's notable that Lou Reed, who does appear on the album, was also under contract to RCA Victor.) Desmond Child has mentioned in a magazine interview that he collaborated with David Bowie on the song "The Night Was Not" (the song did appear on the soundtrack, performed by Desmond Child & Rouge). Another rumor is that Bowie intended to provide a re-recorded version of his 1971 song "Life on Mars?" for the soundtrack. Although no such re-recording has been substantiated, much less released, Bowie did perform a rearranged version of "Life on Mars?" when he guested on The Tonight Show starring Johnny Carson on September 5, 1980 (a month before the release of Times Square).

Track listing
All songs produced 1980 except as noted.

 This is an early version; later released on Replicas Redux. Although the Times Square film and soundtrack list the song as being performed by Gary Numan, it was actually recorded when Numan performed under the band name Tubeway Army.

Charts

References

External links

 
 
 

1980 drama films
1980 films
1980 LGBT-related films
1980s teen drama films
American LGBT-related films
American teen drama films
EMI Films films
1980s English-language films
Films directed by Allan Moyle
Films produced by Robert Stigwood
Films set in New York City
Punk films
Riot grrrl films
1980s American films
Films about runaways
1980s female buddy films